Son Sang-Pil (Hangul: 손상필, Hanja: 孫相弼; born September 1, 1973 in Seoul) is a retired South Korean Greco-Roman wrestler.

Son claimed the gold medals in the Groco-Roman 69 kg class at the 1997 and 1999 World Championships.

At the 1998 Asian Games, Son won the gold medal in the Greco-Roman 69 kg class, defeating 1998 World 63 kg Champion Mkhitar Manukyan in the final match.

While competing in the Sydney 2000 Summer Olympics, many considered Son a gold medal favorite. However, he was eliminated in the quarterfinals, losing to eventual gold medalist Filiberto Azcuy of Cuba 9–2.

External links
Son Sang-Pil's profile from sports-references

1973 births
Living people
South Korean wrestlers
Olympic wrestlers of South Korea
Wrestlers at the 2000 Summer Olympics
South Korean male sport wrestlers
Asian Games medalists in wrestling
Wrestlers at the 1998 Asian Games
World Wrestling Championships medalists
Asian Games gold medalists for South Korea

Medalists at the 1998 Asian Games
20th-century South Korean people
21st-century South Korean people